Present Estonian system of rank insignia is a direct descendant of various systems used in the past in the Estonian Defence Forces. Some of the grades trace their name back to the period of World Wars, for instance, the rank of aspirant literally means an officer in training in military academies or voluntaries, serving as temporary officers.

Most of the Estonian Army ranks were established during the Estonian War of Independence and in the 1920s. These include the rank of kapral, which is a derivate of Italian caporale – much like the English equivalent of corporal. After the Soviet occupation ended in 1991, a new rank was established, creating for the first time a brigadier general rank in the armed forces of Estonia. In Estonia, rank insignia is worn on the chest. Estonian Junior NCOs are considered as a rank of a conscript NCO or NCO in reserve. In full-time service, junior sergeants and petty officers 3rd class are filling in various soldier positions, and naval ratings and are not taken as NCOs.

Estonian Land Forces ranks and insignia

Officer candidates

Aspirants

Estonian Navy ranks and insignia

Estonian Air Force ranks and insignia

Kaitseliit staff positions and insignia 
Officially abolished in 2013. Kaitseliit now uses ranks and insignia identical to the Land Forces.

See also
Estonian Defence Forces

References

External links
Estonian Defence Forces
Estonian Ministry of Defence